The Chocolate Girl is one of the most prominent pastels of Genevan artist Jean-Étienne Liotard, showing a chocolate-serving maid. The girl carries a tray with a porcelain chocolate cup and a glass of water. Liotard's contemporaries classed The Chocolate Girl as his masterpiece.

On 3 February 1745 Francesco Algarotti purchased the  drawing directly from Liotard in Venice. In an unknown year (between 1747 and 1754?) the picture became part of the collection of August III of Poland. In a letter dated 13 February 1751 to his friend Pierre-Jean Mariette he wrote: 

Since 1855 the picture with the serving maid from Vienna, who might have been a certain Nannerl Baldauf, has hung in the Gemäldegalerie Alte Meister, Dresden. Theories concerning the girl's headdress run from a cap cover to an echo of the colorful regional caps. The girl's apron features a small bodice. During World War II the Germans transported it to Königstein Fortress. The delicate pastel managed to survive the cold and damp there and was brought back to Dresden after the Germans retreated from advancing Soviet troops. After World War II, the painting was briefly in possession of the Soviet Union.

In 1862 the American Baker's Chocolate Company obtained the rights to use the pastel.

Around 1900, La Belle Chocolatière served as inspiration for the commercial illustration of the "nurse" that appeared on Droste's cocoa tins. This was most probably a work of the commercial artist Jan (Johannes) Misset. According to Droste, "The illustration indicated the wholesome effect of chocolate milk and became inextricably bound with the name Droste."

Notes

External links

 jefferson.library.millersville.edu
 Das Wiener Chocolade Maedchen 
Story of The Chocolate Girl
"La Belle Chocolatière: The Story Of the Beautiful Chocolate-Girl"

1744 paintings
Portraits by Swiss artists
18th-century portraits
Swiss art
Portraits of women
Chocolate drinks
Chocolate culture